Floppy hat may refer to:
Cloche hat
Sun hat